Trenant is a hamlet in the civil parish of St Neot. There was formerly a Bible Christian chapel in Trenant.

There are also places called Trenant in the parishes of Egloshayle (near Wadebridge) and Fowey.

References

Hamlets in Cornwall